In Mandaeism, Yurba is an uthra (angelic or celestial being). Lidzbarski (1905, 1920) spells his name as spelled Jōrabba. Yurba, who is also called the fighter, is identified with Shamish, the sun. In Mandaean texts, Yurba is often mentioned as engaging in conversation with Ruha.

Book 18 of the Right Ginza equates Yurba with Adonai of Judaism, while Gelbert (2017) identifies Yurba with Yao. He is mentioned in Right Ginza 3, 5.3 (which mentions Yurba as a matarta guardian), 8, 12.1, 15.5, and 18 and Left Ginza 2.22 and 3.45. Mandaean Book of John chapter 52 is a narrative dedicated to Yurba.

See also
 List of angels in theology

References

Uthras
Individual angels